Silvia Bessy Ayala Figueroa (born 14 December 1969, in Cortés) is a Honduran lawyer and politician. She served as deputy of the National Congress of Honduras representing the Democratic Unification Party for Cortés during the 2006–10 term.

She ran as a candidate for deputy representing LIBRE for the 2013 general election.

References

1969 births
Living people
People from Cortés Department
Honduran women lawyers
Deputies of the National Congress of Honduras
Democratic Unification Party politicians
Liberty and Refoundation politicians
21st-century Honduran women politicians
21st-century Honduran politicians
20th-century Honduran lawyers